"The Ship Song" is a song written by Nick Cave (lyrics and music), originally performed by Nick Cave and the Bad Seeds on their 1990 The Good Son album. It was released by Mute Records as the first single from the album on 12 March 1990, as a CD single, 7" vinyl and a 12" vinyl release.  The song reached #84 on the UK Singles Charts.

The video for the song was directed by John Hillcoat.

In May 2001 "The Ship Song" was selected by Australasian Performing Right Association (APRA) as one of the Top 30 Australian songs of all time.

Cover versions

There have been numerous cover versions of the song performed by artists, including Camille O'Sullivan,  Leatherface, Frankie Stubbs, Gene, Swirl, Boo Hewerdine, Concrete Blonde, Denis Walter, Immaculate Fools, Heather Nova and  Lissie.

The Sydney Opera House, with agency The Monkeys, achieved the collaboration of Neil Finn, Kev Carmody, Sarah Blasko, John Bell, Martha Wainwright, Katie Noonan, Paul Kelly, Teddy Tahu Rhodes, The Temper Trap, Angus and Julia Stone, and Daniel Johns, with Opera Australia, the Australian Ballet, Bangarra Dance Theatre, the Sydney Symphony Orchestra, and the Australian Chamber Orchestra, to perform and record a reinterpretation of "The Ship Song" over some months in 2010-2011.  Titled "The Ship Song Project", the recording was to promote the Sydney Opera House.

Track listing
The track listing for the single is:

 "The Ship Song" (Nick Cave) - 5:14
 "The Train Song" (Nick Cave) - 3:27

Personnel
 Blixa Bargeld — guitar, backing vocals 
 Nick Cave — vocals, piano, hammond organ
 Kid Congo Powers — guitar
 Mick Harvey — bass, guitar, vibraphone, backing vocals
 Thomas Wydler — drums

Credits
 Bill McGee — string arrangement
 Designlayout — artwork
 Polly Borland — photography 
 Victor Van Vugt — engineer
 The Bad seeds — producer

Releases

See also
Nick Cave and The Bad Seeds discography

References

APRA Award winners
Nick Cave songs
1990 singles
Song recordings produced by Flood (producer)
Songs written by Nick Cave
1990 songs
Mute Records singles